The 2019–20 season was Crystal Palace's seventh consecutive season in the Premier League (extending their longest ever spell in the top division of English football) and the 114th year in their history. In this season, Palace participated in the Premier League, FA Cup and EFL Cup. The season covered the period from 1 July 2019 to 26 July 2020 as the season was extended due to the COVID-19 pandemic in the United Kingdom.

Season summary

August
Crystal Palace started the 2019–20 season relatively positively, with a 0–0 draw at home to Everton. The next week Palace lost 1–0 to newly promoted Sheffield United, with John Lundstram scoring the only goal early in the second half. Palace got their first two goals of the season in a shock 2–1 win at Manchester United. Jordan Ayew scored midway through the first half, with Daniel James thinking he'd rescued a point for Manchester United with his curling equaliser late on. However, Patrick van Aanholt scored past the goalkeeper at the near post winning the game for Crystal Palace in stoppage time. Palace then entered the EFL Cup in the second round, being drawn at home to League Two Colchester United. After a 0–0 draw, Palace lost the penalty shootout after Andros Townsend’s penalty was saved by goalkeeper Dean Gerken. Back in the Premier League, Palace beat Aston Villa 1–0, but the game turned toxic after a decision by referee Kevin Friend to disallow a late equaliser by Henri Lansbury.

September
After the international break, Crystal Palace were back in action at the Tottenham Hotspur Stadium, losing 4–0, with goals from Son Heung-Min, Erik Lamela and a Patrick van Aanholt own goal. The first home game in September came against Wolverhampton Wanderers. Palace took the lead early in the second half thanks to a fortunate own goal from Leander Dendoncker, but could not hold on due to Diogo Jota’s last-gasp equaliser. The next game was also at Selhurst Park, a 2–0 win over Norwich City with goals from Andros Townsend and a Luka Milivojević penalty.

October
Palace started October strongly, where despite going 1–0 down to Sebastien Haller’s goal for West Ham United, a Luka Milivojević penalty levelled the game. Jordan Ayew then scored a late winner, initially ruled out for offside but given by VAR. After an international break, Palace were back at Selhurst Park against Manchester City where goals from Gabriel Jesus and David Silva downed the high-spirited Eagles. The next game was away to Arsenal, where despite going 2–0 down with goals from Sokratis and David Luiz after just 10 minutes, a stunning fightback ensued with a Luka Milivojević penalty and a header from Jordan Ayew levelled the game at 2–2. Sokratis Papasthopoulos then had a late winner disallowed by VAR due to a foul on Luka Milivojević.

Pre-season
Palace confirmed their pre-season schedule in June 2019. A friendly against Barnet was also confirmed.

Competitions

Premier League

Palace competed in the Premier League for the seventh year in a row, and finished the season in 14th place.

League table

Results summary

Results by matchday

Matches
The Premier League fixtures for the season were announced on 13 June 2019, with Palace's first match a home match against Everton.

FA Cup

Crystal Palace entered the FA Cup in the third round, in early January 2020, along with the other 19 Premier League teams. They were drawn at home to Championship team Derby County, and lost the game by a single goal.

EFL Cup

The second round draw was made on 13 August 2019 following the conclusion of all but one first round matches. Palace were drawn at home against Colchester United, and, after a goal-less game, were knocked out in a penalty shoot-out.

Players

First-team squad

Player statistics

Appearances and goals

|-
! colspan=14 style=background:#DCDCDC; text-align:center| Goalkeepers

|-
! colspan=14 style=background:#DCDCDC; text-align:center| Defenders

|-
! colspan=14 style=background:#DCDCDC; text-align:center| Midfielders

|-
! colspan=14 style=background:#DCDCDC; text-align:center| Forwards

|-
! colspan=14 style=background:#dcdcdc; text-align:center| Players who left the club during the season

|}

Goalscorers

Disciplinary record

Transfers

Transfers in

Loans in

Transfers out

Loans out

Notes

References

Crystal Palace F.C. seasons
Crystal Palace
Crystal Palace
Crystal Palace